The 2001–02 New York Islanders season was the 30th season of the professional ice hockey team. This season saw the Islanders finish in second place in the Atlantic Division with a record of 42 wins, 28 losses, eight ties and four overtime losses for 96 points. They qualified for the playoffs for the first time since 1994 as the fifth seed in the Eastern Conference, but lost their first-round playoff series to the Toronto Maple Leafs in seven games.

Off-season
Newly acquired forward Michael Peca was named team captain.

Regular season
The Islanders scored the most shorthanded goals during the regular season, with 17.

Final standings

Playoffs

Schedule and results

Regular season

|- align="center" bgcolor="#CCFFCC"
|1||W||October 5, 2001||3–2 || align="left"| @ Tampa Bay Lightning (2001–02) ||1–0–0–0 || 
|- align="center" bgcolor="#CCFFCC"
|2||W||October 6, 2001||3–0 || align="left"| @ Florida Panthers (2001–02) ||2–0–0–0 || 
|- align="center" bgcolor="#CCFFCC"
|3||W||October 10, 2001||6–3 || align="left"| @ Pittsburgh Penguins (2001–02) ||3–0–0–0 || 
|- align="center" bgcolor="#CCFFCC"
|4||W||October 11, 2001||6–4 || align="left"| @ New Jersey Devils (2001–02) ||4–0–0–0 || 
|- align="center" bgcolor="#FF6F6F"
|5||OTL||October 13, 2001||4–5 OT|| align="left"|  Detroit Red Wings (2001–02) ||4–0–0–1 || 
|- align="center" bgcolor="#CCFFCC"
|6||W||October 17, 2001||4–0 || align="left"| @ Carolina Hurricanes (2001–02) ||5–0–0–1 || 
|- align="center" bgcolor="#CCFFCC"
|7||W||October 18, 2001||2–1 OT|| align="left"|  Carolina Hurricanes (2001–02) ||6–0–0–1 || 
|- align="center"
|8||T||October 20, 2001||2–2 OT|| align="left"|  San Jose Sharks (2001–02) ||6–0–1–1 || 
|- align="center" bgcolor="#CCFFCC"
|9||W||October 26, 2001||3–2 OT|| align="left"| @ Carolina Hurricanes (2001–02) ||7–0–1–1 || 
|- align="center" bgcolor="#CCFFCC"
|10||W||October 28, 2001||3–2 OT|| align="left"|  Dallas Stars (2001–02) ||8–0–1–1 || 
|- align="center" bgcolor="#CCFFCC"
|11||W||October 30, 2001||3–2 || align="left"|  Florida Panthers (2001–02) ||9–0–1–1 || 
|-

|- align="center" bgcolor="#FFBBBB"
|12||L||November 2, 2001||1–2 || align="left"| @ Detroit Red Wings (2001–02) ||9–1–1–1 || 
|- align="center" bgcolor="#CCFFCC"
|13||W||November 3, 2001||2–1 || align="left"| @ Philadelphia Flyers (2001–02) ||10–1–1–1 || 
|- align="center" bgcolor="#CCFFCC"
|14||W||November 6, 2001||3–0 || align="left"|  Tampa Bay Lightning (2001–02) ||11–1–1–1 || 
|- align="center" bgcolor="#FFBBBB"
|15||L||November 8, 2001||2–6 || align="left"|  New York Rangers (2001–02) ||11–2–1–1 || 
|- align="center" bgcolor="#FFBBBB"
|16||L||November 10, 2001||2–3 || align="left"| @ Montreal Canadiens (2001–02) ||11–3–1–1 || 
|- align="center"
|17||T||November 14, 2001||3–3 OT|| align="left"| @ Pittsburgh Penguins (2001–02) ||11–3–2–1 || 
|- align="center" bgcolor="#FFBBBB"
|18||L||November 16, 2001||0–1 || align="left"| @ Colorado Avalanche (2001–02) ||11–4–2–1 || 
|- align="center" bgcolor="#FFBBBB"
|19||L||November 17, 2001||1–6 || align="left"| @ Phoenix Coyotes (2001–02) ||11–5–2–1 || 
|- align="center" bgcolor="#CCFFCC"
|20||W||November 19, 2001||3–2 || align="left"| @ Dallas Stars (2001–02) ||12–5–2–1 || 
|- align="center" bgcolor="#CCFFCC"
|21||W||November 21, 2001||5–4 || align="left"|  Colorado Avalanche (2001–02) ||13–5–2–1 || 
|- align="center" bgcolor="#CCFFCC"
|22||W||November 23, 2001||3–1 || align="left"|  Toronto Maple Leafs (2001–02) ||14–5–2–1 || 
|- align="center" bgcolor="#CCFFCC"
|23||W||November 24, 2001||5–3 || align="left"|  Mighty Ducks of Anaheim (2001–02) ||15–5–2–1 || 
|- align="center"
|24||T||November 27, 2001||5–5 OT|| align="left"|  Washington Capitals (2001–02) ||15–5–3–1 || 
|- align="center"
|25||T||November 29, 2001||1–1 OT|| align="left"|  Montreal Canadiens (2001–02) ||15–5–4–1 || 
|-

|- align="center" bgcolor="#FFBBBB"
|26||L||December 1, 2001||2–4 || align="left"|  Buffalo Sabres (2001–02) ||15–6–4–1 || 
|- align="center" bgcolor="#FFBBBB"
|27||L||December 4, 2001||2–3 || align="left"|  Philadelphia Flyers (2001–02) ||15–7–4–1 || 
|- align="center" bgcolor="#CCFFCC"
|28||W||December 6, 2001||2–0 || align="left"| @ Philadelphia Flyers (2001–02) ||16–7–4–1 || 
|- align="center" bgcolor="#FFBBBB"
|29||L||December 7, 2001||3–4 || align="left"| @ Chicago Blackhawks (2001–02) ||16–8–4–1 || 
|- align="center"
|30||T||December 11, 2001||2–2 OT|| align="left"|  Ottawa Senators (2001–02) ||16–8–5–1 || 
|- align="center" bgcolor="#FF6F6F"
|31||OTL||December 12, 2001||2–3 OT|| align="left"| @ New Jersey Devils (2001–02) ||16–8–5–2 || 
|- align="center" bgcolor="#FFBBBB"
|32||L||December 15, 2001||1–3 || align="left"|  Florida Panthers (2001–02) ||16–9–5–2 || 
|- align="center" bgcolor="#CCFFCC"
|33||W||December 18, 2001||4–1 || align="left"|  Edmonton Oilers (2001–02) ||17–9–5–2 || 
|- align="center" bgcolor="#CCFFCC"
|34||W||December 21, 2001||2–1 || align="left"| @ New York Rangers (2001–02) ||18–9–5–2 || 
|- align="center" bgcolor="#FFBBBB"
|35||L||December 22, 2001||2–4 || align="left"|  Boston Bruins (2001–02) ||18–10–5–2 || 
|- align="center" bgcolor="#FFBBBB"
|36||L||December 27, 2001||2–5 || align="left"| @ Ottawa Senators (2001–02) ||18–11–5–2 || 
|- align="center" bgcolor="#CCFFCC"
|37||W||December 29, 2001||6–5 OT|| align="left"|  Montreal Canadiens (2001–02) ||19–11–5–2 || 
|-

|- align="center" bgcolor="#FFBBBB"
|38||L||January 1, 2002||2–3 || align="left"| @ Washington Capitals (2001–02) ||19–12–5–2 || 
|- align="center" bgcolor="#CCFFCC"
|39||W||January 3, 2002||4–2 || align="left"|  Pittsburgh Penguins (2001–02) ||20–12–5–2 || 
|- align="center" bgcolor="#FFBBBB"
|40||L||January 5, 2002||0–3 || align="left"|  Los Angeles Kings (2001–02) ||20–13–5–2 || 
|- align="center" bgcolor="#CCFFCC"
|41||W||January 6, 2002||3–2 || align="left"| @ Atlanta Thrashers (2001–02) ||21–13–5–2 || 
|- align="center" bgcolor="#FFBBBB"
|42||L||January 8, 2002||2–5 || align="left"|  Calgary Flames (2001–02) ||21–14–5–2 || 
|- align="center" bgcolor="#FFBBBB"
|43||L||January 10, 2002||0–4 || align="left"| @ Montreal Canadiens (2001–02) ||21–15–5–2 || 
|- align="center" bgcolor="#CCFFCC"
|44||W||January 12, 2002||5–4 || align="left"| @ Boston Bruins (2001–02) ||22–15–5–2 || 
|- align="center" bgcolor="#CCFFCC"
|45||W||January 15, 2002||3–1 || align="left"| @ Calgary Flames (2001–02) ||23–15–5–2 || 
|- align="center" bgcolor="#FFBBBB"
|46||L||January 17, 2002||2–3 || align="left"| @ San Jose Sharks (2001–02) ||23–16–5–2 || 
|- align="center" bgcolor="#CCFFCC"
|47||W||January 19, 2002||3–2 || align="left"| @ Los Angeles Kings (2001–02) ||24–16–5–2 || 
|- align="center" bgcolor="#FFBBBB"
|48||L||January 22, 2002||4–5 || align="left"|  New York Rangers (2001–02) ||24–17–5–2 || 
|- align="center" bgcolor="#FF6F6F"
|49||OTL||January 24, 2002||4–5 OT|| align="left"|  Pittsburgh Penguins (2001–02) ||24–17–5–3 || 
|- align="center" bgcolor="#CCFFCC"
|50||W||January 26, 2002||6–2 || align="left"|  Tampa Bay Lightning (2001–02) ||25–17–5–3 || 
|- align="center" bgcolor="#FFBBBB"
|51||L||January 29, 2002||1–3 || align="left"|  New Jersey Devils (2001–02) ||25–18–5–3 || 
|- align="center" bgcolor="#CCFFCC"
|52||W||January 30, 2002||6–3 || align="left"| @ New York Rangers (2001–02) ||26–18–5–3 || 
|-

|- align="center"
|53||T||February 4, 2002||6–6 OT|| align="left"| @ Florida Panthers (2001–02) ||26–18–6–3 || 
|- align="center" bgcolor="#CCFFCC"
|54||W||February 5, 2002||4–3 || align="left"|  St. Louis Blues (2001–02) ||27–18–6–3 || 
|- align="center" bgcolor="#CCFFCC"
|55||W||February 7, 2002||4–1 || align="left"|  Toronto Maple Leafs (2001–02) ||28–18–6–3 || 
|- align="center" bgcolor="#FFBBBB"
|56||L||February 10, 2002||3–4 || align="left"| @ Minnesota Wild (2001–02) ||28–19–6–3 || 
|- align="center" bgcolor="#CCFFCC"
|57||W||February 12, 2002||1–0 OT|| align="left"| @ Philadelphia Flyers (2001–02) ||29–19–6–3 || 
|- align="center"
|58||T||February 26, 2002||3–3 OT|| align="left"|  Boston Bruins (2001–02) ||29–19–7–3 || 
|-

|- align="center" bgcolor="#FFBBBB"
|59||L||March 1, 2002||3–4 || align="left"| @ Atlanta Thrashers (2001–02) ||29–20–7–3 || 
|- align="center" bgcolor="#CCFFCC"
|60||W||March 2, 2002||4–1 || align="left"|  Atlanta Thrashers (2001–02) ||30–20–7–3 || 
|- align="center" bgcolor="#FFBBBB"
|61||L||March 4, 2002||2–4 || align="left"|  Pittsburgh Penguins (2001–02) ||30–21–7–3 || 
|- align="center" bgcolor="#FFBBBB"
|62||L||March 7, 2002||0–5 || align="left"|  Buffalo Sabres (2001–02) ||30–22–7–3 || 
|- align="center" bgcolor="#FFBBBB"
|63||L||March 8, 2002||2–4 || align="left"| @ Columbus Blue Jackets (2001–02) ||30–23–7–3 || 
|- align="center" bgcolor="#CCFFCC"
|64||W||March 10, 2002||6–1 || align="left"|  Atlanta Thrashers (2001–02) ||31–23–7–3 || 
|- align="center" bgcolor="#CCFFCC"
|65||W||March 12, 2002||3–0 || align="left"| @ Buffalo Sabres (2001–02) ||32–23–7–3 || 
|- align="center" bgcolor="#FFBBBB"
|66||L||March 13, 2002||2–3 || align="left"| @ New Jersey Devils (2001–02) ||32–24–7–3 || 
|- align="center" bgcolor="#FFBBBB"
|67||L||March 16, 2002||3–4 || align="left"| @ Ottawa Senators (2001–02) ||32–25–7–3 || 
|- align="center" bgcolor="#FF6F6F"
|68||OTL||March 19, 2002||2–3 OT|| align="left"| @ Toronto Maple Leafs (2001–02) ||32–25–7–4 || 
|- align="center" bgcolor="#CCFFCC"
|69||W||March 21, 2002||3–2 || align="left"|  Vancouver Canucks (2001–02) ||33–25–7–4 || 
|- align="center" bgcolor="#CCFFCC"
|70||W||March 23, 2002||2–1 || align="left"|  Minnesota Wild (2001–02) ||34–25–7–4 || 
|- align="center" bgcolor="#CCFFCC"
|71||W||March 25, 2002||4–2 || align="left"|  New York Rangers (2001–02) ||35–25–7–4 || 
|- align="center" bgcolor="#FFBBBB"
|72||L||March 27, 2002||1–4 || align="left"|  Ottawa Senators (2001–02) ||35–26–7–4 || 
|- align="center" bgcolor="#CCFFCC"
|73||W||March 28, 2002||5–4 || align="left"| @ Toronto Maple Leafs (2001–02) ||36–26–7–4 || 
|- align="center" bgcolor="#FFBBBB"
|74||L||March 30, 2002||2–4 || align="left"| @ Washington Capitals (2001–02) ||36–27–7–4 || 
|-

|- align="center" bgcolor="#CCFFCC"
|75||W||April 1, 2002||4–2 || align="left"|  New Jersey Devils (2001–02) ||37–27–7–4 || 
|- align="center"
|76||T||April 3, 2002||1–1 OT|| align="left"| @ Buffalo Sabres (2001–02) ||37–27–8–4 || 
|- align="center" bgcolor="#CCFFCC"
|77||W||April 4, 2002||2–1 OT|| align="left"| @ Boston Bruins (2001–02) ||38–27–8–4 || 
|- align="center" bgcolor="#CCFFCC"
|78||W||April 6, 2002||5–4 || align="left"|  Washington Capitals (2001–02) ||39–27–8–4 || 
|- align="center" bgcolor="#FFBBBB"
|79||L||April 8, 2002||1–2 || align="left"|  Carolina Hurricanes (2001–02) ||39–28–8–4 || 
|- align="center" bgcolor="#CCFFCC"
|80||W||April 11, 2002||5–2 || align="left"| @ Nashville Predators (2001–02) ||40–28–8–4 || 
|- align="center" bgcolor="#CCFFCC"
|81||W||April 12, 2002||3–1 || align="left"| @ Tampa Bay Lightning (2001–02) ||41–28–8–4 || 
|- align="center" bgcolor="#CCFFCC"
|82||W||April 14, 2002||3–1 || align="left"|  Philadelphia Flyers (2001–02) ||42–28–8–4 || 
|-

|-
| Legend:

Playoffs

|- align="center" bgcolor="#FFBBBB"
| 1 ||L|| April 18, 2002 || 1–3 || align="left"| @ Toronto Maple Leafs || Maple Leafs lead 1–0 || 
|- align="center" bgcolor="#FFBBBB"
| 2 ||L|| April 20, 2002 || 0–2 || align="left"| @ Toronto Maple Leafs || Maple Leafs lead 2–0 || 
|- align="center" bgcolor="#CCFFCC"
| 3 ||W|| April 23, 2002 || 6–1 || align="left"| Toronto Maple Leafs || Maple Leafs lead 2–1 || 
|- align="center" bgcolor="#CCFFCC"
| 4 ||W|| April 24, 2002 || 4–3 || align="left"| Toronto Maple Leafs || Series tied 2–2 || 
|- align="center" bgcolor="#FFBBBB"
| 5 ||L|| April 26, 2002 || 3–6 || align="left"| @ Toronto Maple Leafs || Maple Leafs lead 3–2 || 
|- align="center" bgcolor="#CCFFCC"
| 6 ||W|| April 28, 2002 || 5–3 || align="left"| Toronto Maple Leafs || Series tied 3–3 || 
|- align="center" bgcolor="#FFBBBB"
| 7 ||L|| April 30, 2002 || 2–4 || align="left"| @ Toronto Maple Leafs || Maple Leafs win 4–3 || 
|-

|-
| Legend:

Player statistics

Scoring
 Position abbreviations: C = Center; D = Defense; G = Goaltender; LW = Left Wing; RW = Right Wing
  = Joined team via a transaction (e.g., trade, waivers, signing) during the season. Stats reflect time with the Islanders only.
  = Left team via a transaction (e.g., trade, waivers, release) during the season. Stats reflect time with the Islanders only.

Goaltending

Awards and records

Transactions
The Islanders were involved in the following transactions from June 10, 2001, the day after the deciding game of the 2001 Stanley Cup Finals, through June 13, 2002, the day of the deciding game of the 2002 Stanley Cup Finals.

Trades

Players acquired

Players lost

Signings

Draft picks
New York's draft picks at the 2001 NHL Entry Draft held at the National Car Rental Center in Sunrise, Florida.

See also
 2001–02 NHL season

Notes

References

New York Islanders seasons
New York Islanders
New York Islanders
New York Islanders
New York Islanders